The Knockout Stage of the 1999 Fed Cup Europe/Africa Zone Group I was the final stage of the Zonal Competition involving teams from Europe and Africa. Those that qualified for this stage placed first and second in their respective pools.

The eight teams were then randomly drawn into two two-stage knockout tournaments, with the winners advancing to the World Group II Play-offs.

Draw

Semifinals

South Africa vs. Sweden

Bulgaria vs. Slovenia

Romania vs. Ukraine

Luxembourg vs. Great Britain

Finals

South Africa vs. Slovenia

  advanced to the World Group II Play-offs, where they placed last in their pool of four, and thus relegated back to Group I for 2000.

Romania vs. Great Britain

  advanced to the World Group II Play-offs, where they placed third in their pool of four, and thus relegated back to Group I for 2000.

See also
Fed Cup structure

References

External links
 Fed Cup website

1999 Fed Cup Europe/Africa Zone